Dutch in Seven Lessons (Nederlands in zeven lessen) is a 1948 film produced in the Netherlands. Audrey Hepburn made her film debut playing a KLM stewardess in a small role. It was originally shot as part of an English documentary series on aspects of the Netherlands but later expanded to feature film length for an unsuccessful domestic release. Their running times were 39 and 79 minutes respectively.

References

External links

RARE 18 year old AUDREY HEPBURN in her 1948 acting debut 'Dutch in Seven Lessons' on YouTube

1948 films
Dutch black-and-white films
Dutch documentary films
1948 documentary films